Light House is a 1976 Indian Malayalam film,  directed and produced by A. B. Raj. The film stars Prem Nazir, Jayan, Jayabharathi and KPAC Lalitha in the lead roles. The film has musical score by M. K. Arjunan.

Cast

Prem Nazir as Ravi/Omanakuttan
Jayabharathi as Geetha
Adoor Bhasi as Chandu
Bahadoor as Damu
KPAC Lalitha as Thankamma
Jose Prakash as Jayaprakash
Sankaradi as Raghavan Pilla
P. R. Varalakshmi as Usha
Sreelatha Namboothiri as Bindu
Meena as Meenakshi
P. K. Abraham as Rajasekharan, Vikraman (double role)
Raghavan as Raghu
G. K. Pillai as President
T. P. Madhavan as Bhaskaran Nair
Mancheri Chandran as Secretary
Paul Vengola as Watcher
Mallika Sukumaran as Mallika
Vanchiyoor Radha as Madhaviyamma
Maniyanpilla Raju as Thankamma's brother
Santo Krishnan as Velu
Seetharam

Soundtrack
The music was composed by M. K. Arjunan and the lyrics were written by Sreekumaran Thampi.

References

External links
 

1976 films
1970s Malayalam-language films